The 2002 Greek local elections elected representatives to Greece's super-prefectures, 54 prefectures, provinces, and approximately 1,033 communities and municipalities.

The local elections in Greece traditionally occur during the month of October.

Candidates at local elections do not run under the official name of the party they belong, but form electoral platforms with different names for the purpose.

Elections

Municipal mayoralties

Candidates supported by New Democracy won in all the three major municipalities, Athens, Thessaloniki and Piraeus.

Municipality of Athens

Dora Bakoyannis, a prominent member of New Democracy, won the election and replaced Dimitris Avramopoulos as mayor of Athens (first term).

Municipality of Piraeus
Christos Agrapidis was reelected mayor of Piraeus (second term) with the support of New Democracy.

Municipality of Thessaloniki
Vasilis Papageorgopoulos was reelected mayor of Thessaloniki with the support of New Democracy.

Super-Prefectural elections

Athens-Piraeus

Fofi Gennimata won the mainly ceremonial position of the super-prefect of Athens-Piraeus (first term) supported by PASOK. The coalition supported by New Democracy suffered a setback because of the unpopularity of Ioannis Tzanetakos and because of the candidacy of Georgios Karatzaferis.

Sub-prefectures of the Athens-Piraeus super-prefecture

Athens Prefecture

Elected prefect:Yiannis Sgouros (supported by PASOK)

Piraeus Prefecture

Elected Prefect:Yiannis Mihas (supported by PASOK)

Drama-Kavala-Xanthi

Evros-Rhodope

Prefectural elections

Thessaloniki Prefecture

Local elections in Greece
Local elections
2002 elections in Greece
October 2002 events in Europe